In mathematics, projective group may refer to:

 Projective linear group or one of the related linear groups
 Projective orthogonal group
 Projective unitary group
 Projective symplectic group
 Projective semilinear group
 Projective profinite group, a profinite group with the embedding property